Peter Holden is an American actor and producer of film and television.

Filmography

Film 
Options (1989, as Buck)
In Too Deep (1990, as Police Officer)
Dangerous Pursuit (1990, as Counterman)
Fatal Exposure (1991, as Hank)
Child of Darkness, Child of Light (1991, as Michael's gang)
Daisy de melker (1993, as Dr. Ferguson)
Woman of Desire (1994, as Michael Altman)
Cheap Philosophy (1995, as Philosopher) (short)
Ladies Room L.A. (2000)
The Theory of Everything (2000, as Russell)
XCU: Extreme Close Up (2001)
No Turning Back (2001, as Recruiter)
The Victim (2001)
Reality School (2002, as Student)
Out of Step (2002, as Mr. Rigg)
Safe Journey (2002)
Black Hole (2002, as Diego)
Saints and Soldiers (2003, as Sgt. Gordon Gunderson)
Next Exit (2005, as William)
Taphephobia (2006, as Stirling)
On a Tuesday (2007, as Mr. Brown)
The Beneficiary (2008, as Andrew Williams)
Pandemic (2009, as Spenser)
The Social Network (2010, as Facebook Lawyer)
The Dark Knight Rises (2012, as Applied Sciences Tech)
Under the Bed (2012, as Terry Hausman)
A Golden Christmas 3 (2012, as Nick)
Lovelace (2013, as Alex - Medical Salesman)
Abashed (2013, as David)
Foreign Land (2013, as Father Roberts)
Alien Abduction (2014, as Peter Morris)
The Incident(s) at Paradise Bay (2013, as David Kay)
Drowning (2014, as Dr. Trent Gregor)
Perception (2014, as Bob Stenson)

Television
The Wonder Years (1993, 2 episodes, as Nick Sadowski)
Living in Captivity (1998, 1 episode)
The Pretender (1999, 1 episode, as Radio Station Manager)
Frasier (1999, 1 episode, as Steven)
Charmed (2000, 1 episode, as Worker #2)
Philly; (2002, 1 episode, as Attendant)
CSI: Crime Scene Investigation (2002, 1 episode, as Augie Heitz)
Miss Match (2003, 1 episode, as Tony Barre)
10-8: Officers on Duty (2004, 1 episode, as Father)
NYPD Blue (2004, 1 episode, as Eric Dooling)
The District (2004, 1 episode, as Robert)
24 (2006, 1 episode, as Harry Swinton)
Scrubs (2008, 1 episode, as Mr. Macrae)
Cold Case (2008, 1 episode, as Harold '05)
Brainstorm (2009, 8 episodes, as Don Yolk)
Bones (2010, 1 episode, as Jesse Byrd)
Ghost Whisperer (2010, 1 episode, as Darren)
NCIS (2010, 1 episode, as Vector Control Worker)
Criminal Minds: Suspect Behavior (2011, 1 episode, as CPS Supervisor)
Desperate Housewives (2011, 1 episode, as Park Ranger)
It's Always Sunny in Philadelphia (2012, 1 episode, as Union Delegate)
Scandal (2013, 1 episode, as William Granville)
Castle (2013, 1 episode, as Ken Caster)

References

External links 
 
 

Living people
American male film actors
Year of birth missing (living people)
American male television actors
Place of birth missing (living people)
American film producers